10 Sport (known as Ten's World of Sport from 1992 until 1996) is the brand that all sporting events broadcast on Network 10, an Australian free-to-air commercial television network. Sports streamed on Paramount+ in Australia since August 2021 are also broadcast under the 10 Sport banner.

All sport events were broadcast under the One HD banner from 26 March 2009 until it ceased being a sole sports channel in early 2011.

History

Australian rules
In 2002, Ten combined with the Nine Network to acquire free-to-air broadcast rights for the AFL, the elite Australian rules competition, displacing the Seven Network which had held the rights for more than 40 years. Ten broadcast Saturday afternoon and Saturday night games and had exclusive rights for all finals games, the network also alternated in showing the pre-season Grand Final and Brownlow Medal count with Nine (Ten telecasted the events in 2002, 2004 and 2006) while they showed each local state team's games that were played by WA, SA, QLD and NSW teams that were played on a Saturday. 
Along with the Seven Network, Ten placed a successful $780 million bid to jointly broadcast the game from 2007 to 2011. Under this deal, Ten continued to broadcast the Saturday component of the competition. However, unlike the previous deal, Ten did not hold the exclusive rights to the finals series. Instead, the networks shared the broadcasting of the finals series and alternated the broadcast of the grand final. In the years when Ten did not televise the Grand Final (2008 and 2010), it telecast the Brownlow Medal presentation and the Nab Cup Grand Final. Ten ended AFL broadcasting at the conclusion of the 2011 season. At the end of 2011, Network Ten lost the rights to the AFL with Seven taking over the free-to-air TV Saturday games. Ten Sport won a Logie Award for "Most Popular Sport Program" at the 2012 TV Week Logie Awards for its telecast of the 2011 AFL Grand Final which was the last to be broadcast.

Basketball
In 1992, Network 10 also used to air the National Basketball League (NBL) during the middle of the basketball boom in Australia from 1992 to 1997, but after delegating games to extremely late night time slots the network eventually ended its broadcasting. In March 2010 however, it was announced that Network 10 and digital channel One would show NBL games for the next 5 years. Starting with 2 games per week, and raising to 5 per week in the 2014/15 season. The network also screened Boomers and Opals games. On the 19 August 2021, The NBL and Channel 10 announced a broadcast deal that would involve 10 Peach showing two games every Sunday, Starting with the 2021/22 Season.

Cricket
In 2013, Ten paid $100 million for exclusive rights to broadcast the Big Bash League from 2013 to 2018, marking the channel's first foray in elite domestic cricket coverage. Ten previously held the broadcast rights to the Indian Premier League.

Horse racing
Network 10 broadcast the Melbourne Cup between 1978 and 2001, and again since 2019. For a brief period in 2019 before the Melbourne Cup, Network 10 also broadcast some International Racing meets from the United Kingdom and France.

Motorsport
Ten has been a long-standing broadcaster of motorsport events. It has produced the motoring show RPM to complement its coverage.

In 2003, Ten started broadcasting the Formula One World Championship after the Nine Network dropped the rights in 2002 after more than twenty years of coverage. Other series broadcast include the Supercars Championship from 1997 to 2006 and 2015 to 2020 and MotoGP since 1997.

In 2017, Ten has dropped its remaining Formula One international live races; it will retained the broadcast rights of Formula One Australian Grand Prix live races and rest of highlights from international races of Formula One World Championship.

Rugby league
Ten broadcast the New South Wales Rugby League premiership from 1983 until 1991. The network was experiencing severe financial problems in the early 1990s, and it was the New South Wales Rugby League that successfully applied to place the network in liquidation in 1991.

Rugby union
Network 10 has broadcast the 1995, 2007 and 2019 Rugby World Cups. From 2013 to 2020, 10 broadcast Wallabies test matches played in Australia and Rugby Championship matches involving the Wallabies.

Soccer
Network 10 in 2007 broadcast its first soccer broadcast with the Sydney FC v LA Galaxy exhibition match. The match was broadcast on the main channel nationally in a three-hour special presentation. In 2017, Ten entered a two-year deal becoming the FTA broadcaster of the A-League and Socceroos matches. 27 matches played on Saturday Nights were simulcasted from Fox Sports on 10 Bold along with five finals matches and Socceroos matches over the two-year period. Fox on One was a three-hour programming block produced by Fox Sports for Network 10 each Saturday night on 10 Bold. It included Back Page Live followed by the live broadcast of the Saturday Night A-League match.

In 2021, Network 10 returned broadcasting soccer acquiring full broadcast rights become the home of Australian Soccer in a five-year deal. One A-League match each Saturday night will be broadcast on the main channel along with one W-League match each Sunday on 10 Bold. All A-League and W-League finals will also be broadcast live and free on FTA. All remainder matches will be streamed on Paramount+. A separate four-year deal was also struck with Football Australia with all Socceroos and Matildas matches to be broadcast on FTA along with for the first time, the FFA Cup Final. Other FFA Cup matches will be streamed on Paramount+. Other content also acquired which will be shown on Network 10 platforms including Under 23 friendlies, Youth national team home matches along with AFC competitions. 10 and Paramount+ also became the official broadcaster of the FA Cup.

Olympic and Commonwealth Games
Ten broadcast both the summer and winter Olympics in 1984 and 1988. Network 10 acquired broadcast rights to the 2014 Winter Olympics for $20 million after all three major commercial networks pulled out of bidding on rights to both the 2014 and 2016 Olympic Games due to cost concerns. The Nine Network had lost $22 million on its joint coverage of the 2012 Games with Foxtel, and the Seven Network's bid was rejected for being lower than what Nine/Foxtel had previously paid.

Network 10, in joint partnership with subscription television provider Foxtel, had broadcast rights for the 2010 Commonwealth Games. It also broadcast the 1994 and 2014 games. Channel 10 won praise for their broadcast of the Olympics and Commonwealth Games with many Australians hoping they return to 10 in the near future.

Events
10 Sport holds broadcast rights to the following events:

Current

Past

Programs
10 Sport has presented the following recurring programs:

Current

Past

Podcasts
10 Sport has presented the following podcasts on 10 Speaks.

Current

10 Sports Staff
Sydney/Queensland
 Scott Mackinnon (Weekends anchor)
 Jelisa Apps (Fill-in anchor)
 Bence Hamerli (NSW sports reporter)
 Chloe-Amanda Bailey (NSW sports reporter)
 Trent Simpson (NSW sports reporter)
 Veronica Eggleton (QLD sports reporter)
 Jacob Chicco (QLD sports reporter)

Melbourne
 Stephen Quartermain (Main anchor)
 Caty Price (sports reporter/Fill-in anchor)
 Rob Waters (sports reporter)
 Nick Butler (reporter)
 Tim Morgan (sports reporter)

Adelaide
 Max Burford (sports reporter)
 Jase Kemp (sports reporter)
 Jodie Oddy (sports reporter)

Perth
 Lachy Reid (Main anchor)
 Steven Allen (sports reporter/Fill-in anchor)
 Ashleigh Nelson (sports reporter)
 Steph Baumgartel (sports reporter)

Staff and commentators

Horse Racing

Melbourne Cup
Current

 Eddie McGuire (host, 2022–present)
 Michael Felgate (host, 2019–present)
 Caty Price, (host, 2019–present)
 Matt Hill (Race caller, 2019–present)
 Francesca Cumani (International racing expert, 2019–present)
 Brittany Taylor (Mounting yard expert, 2019–present)
 David Gately (Racing expert, 2019–present)
 James Winks (Racing expert, 2020–present)
 Michelle Payne (Racing expert, 2021–present)
 Natalie Hunter (Presentations/reporter, 2020–present)
 Georgie Tunny (Racing presenter, 2021–present)
 Rob Mills (Style presenter, 2020–present)
 Kate Freebairn (Fashion presenter, 2021–present)
 Natalie Yoannidis (Reporter, 2021–present)
 Nick Butler (Reporter, 2020–present)
 Lee Steele (Reporter, 2020–present)
 Jono Williams (Reporter, 2020–present)
 Brendan Crew (Reporter, 2021–present)
 Natasha Exelby (Reporter, 2021–present)
 Gerard Middleton (Betting, 2019, 2021–present)

Former

 Stephen Quartermain (host, 2020)
 Gorgi Coghlan (host, 2020)
 Adam Hamilton (Betting, 2020)
 Victoria Latu (Fashions on the Field, 2020)
 Kate Peck (presenter/reporter, 2019)
 Brett Clappis (Reporter, 2020)
 Jo Holley (Reporter, 2020)
 Sarah Harris (Reporter, 2020)
 Tristan MacManus (Reporter, 2020)
 Peter Moody (racing expert, 2019–2020)
 Matt White (Host, 2019)
 Beau Ryan (Reporter, 2019)
 Anna Heinrich (Reporter, 2019)
 Scott Tweedie (Reporter, 2019)
 Dave Thornton (Reporter, 2019)
 Georgia Love (Reporter, 2019)
 Elliot Garnaut (Reporter, 2019)
 Tim Webster (Host, 1991–2001)
 Sandra Sully (Host, late 1990s–2001)
 Peter Donegan (Host, early 1990s–2001)
 Tim Bailey (Reporter, late 1990s–2001)
 Lyn Talbot (Reporter, late 1990s–2001)
 Beau Ryan (Reporter, late 1990s–2001)
 Dan Mielicki (Race Caller, early 1990s–2001)
 Gary Willetts (Race Caller, early 1990s–2001)
 Jenny Chapman (Mounting Yard, late 1990s–2001)
 John Letts (Interviews, late 1980s–2001)
 Tim Gossage (Betting Ring, late 1990s–early 2000s)
 Simon Marshall (Reporter, late 1990s–2001)
 Richard Freeman (Racing Expert, 1990s)
 Mike Gibson (Host, late 1980s–early 1990s)
 Bob Maumill (Betting Ring, late 1980s–early 1990s)
 Bruce McAvaney (Host/Race Caller, late 1980s–early 1990s)
 Peter Keenan (Reporter, late 1980s–early 1990s)
 Graham Kelly (Mounting Yard, late 1980s–early 1990s)
 Jennifer Keyte (presentations, 2019)
 Annie Kearney (reporter, 2019–2020)
 Roz Kelly (presenter/reporter, 2019–2020)

Tabtouch Masters
Present

 Caty Price, (host, 2021–present)
 Brittany Taylor (host, 2021–present)
 James Winks (Racing expert, 2021–present)
 Scott Embry (Racing expert, 2021–present)
 Lochie Taylor (Racing expert, 2021–present)
 Darren McCauley (racecaller, 2021–present)
 Lachy Reid (Mounting yard reporter, 2021–present)
 Lee Steele (reporter, 2021–present)
 Alana McLean (reporter, 2021–present)

Basketball

National Basketball League
Present (through JAM TV)

 Neroli Meadows (host/courtside reporter, 2021–present)
 Jack Heverin (host/commentator, 2021–present)
 Andrew Gaze (commentator, 2010–2015, 2021–present)
 Liam Santamaria (commentator, 2021–present)
 Peter Hooley (commentator, 2021–present)
 Lanard Copeland (commentator, 2021–present)
 John Casey (courtside reporter, 2021–present)
 Shane Heal (courtside reporter, 2010–2014, 2021–present)

Former

 Stephen Quartermain (host/commentator, Melbourne only, 1992–1997)
 Steve Carfino (host/commentator, 1992–1995, 2010–2014)
 Bill Woods (host/commentator, 1992–1997, 2014–2015)
 Brett Maher (commentator, Adelaide only, 2010–2015)
 Tony Ronaldson (commentator, Perth only, 2010–2015)
 Tim Gossage (host/commentator, Perth Only, 1992–1997, 2014)
 Shane Heal (commentator, Sydney only, 2010–2014)
 Lachy Reid (commentator, 2010–2015)

Football

Socceroos Internationals
Present

 Scott Mackinnon (Host, 2021–present)
 Niav Owens (Host, 2021–present)
 Tara Rushton (Host, 2021–present)
 Simon Hill (Play-by-Play Commentator, 2021–present)
 Andy Harper (Play-by-Play Commentator, 2021–present)
 Mark Milligan (Expert Commentator, 2021–present)
 Bruce Djite (Expert Commentator, 2021–present)
 Alex Brosque (Expert Commentator, 2021–present)
 Georgia Yeoman-Dale (Expert Commentator, 2021–present)
 Luke Wilkshire (Expert Commentator, 2018–2019, 2021–present)
 Archie Thompson (Expert Commentator) 2018–2019, 2021–present)
 Tarek Elrich (Expert Commentator, 2021–present)
 Scott McIntyre (Tokyo Sideline Reporter, 2021–present)

Matildas Internationals

 Tara Rushton (Host, 2021–present)
 Simon Hill (Commentator, 2021–present)
 Georgia Yeoman-Dale (Expert Commentator, 2021–present)
 Amy Chapman (Expert Commentator, 2021–present)
 Sarah Walsh (Expert Commentator, 2021–present)
 Ally Green (Expert Commentator, 2021–present)
 Grace Gill (Expert Commentator, 2021–present)
 Andy Harper (Expert Commentator, 2021–present)
 Tom Sermanni (Expert Commentator, 2021–present)
 Bence Hamerli (Sideline Reporter, 2021–present)

A-Leagues/friendly matches
Present - Channel 10 matches

 Tara Rushton (Host, 2017–2019, 2021–present)
 Simon Hill (Commentator, 2021–present)
 Robbie Thomson (Commentator, 2021–present)
 Andy Harper (Expert Commentator, 2017–2019, 2021–present)
 Amy Chapman (Expert Commentator, 2021–present)
 Mark Milligan (Expert Commentator, 2021–present)
 Bruce Djite (Expert Commentator, 2021–present)
 Alex Brosque (Expert Commentator, 2021–present)
 Georgia Yeoman-Dale (Expert Commentator, 2021–present)
 Luke Wilkshire (Expert Commentator, 2018–2019, 2021–present)
 Archie Thompson (Expert Commentator/Sideline Reporter VIC, 2017–2019, 2021–present)
 Tarek Elrich (Expert Commentator, 2021–present)
 Grace Gill (Expert Commentator, 2021–present)
 Daniel Georgievski (Expert Commentator, 2021–present)
 Daniel McBreen (Expert Commentator, 2021–present)
 Kenny Lowe (Expert Commentator, 2021–present)
 Scott McDonald (Expert Commentator, 2021–present)
 Nick Butler (Sideline Reporter VIC, 2021–present)
 Jamie Harnwell (Expert Commentator, 2021–present)
 Amy Duggan (Expert Commentator/Sideline Reporter NSW, 2021–present)
 Tristan MacManus (Sideline Reporter, 2022–present)

Past
 Robbie Slater (Fox Sports feed) 2017–2019
 Mark Bosnich (Fox Sports feed) 2017–2019
 Adam Peacock  (Fox Sports feed) 2017–2019

2007 Sydney FC v LA Galaxy
 Bill Woods (Host) 2007
 David Basheer (Commentator) 2007
 Kevin Muscat (Commentator) 2007
 Mark Howard (Sideline Commentator) 2007

Australian Rules Football
10 Sport previously broadcast Australian Rules Football (2002–2011). The 10 Sport AFL commentary team, won the 2012 Silver Logie Award for "Most Outstanding Sport Program", for its telecast of the 2011 AFL Grand Final hosted by Stephen Quartermain.

Australian Football League

 Stephen Quartermain (host and commentator) (2002–2011)
 Anthony Hudson (host and commentator) (2002–2011)
 Tim Lane (host and commentator) (2003–2011)
 Michael Christian (commentator & The Fifth Quarter) (2002–2011)
 Malcolm Blight (expert commentator & The Fifth Quarter) (2002–2011)
 Robert Walls (expert commentator) (2002–2011)
 Luke Darcy (expert commentator & The Fifth Quarter) (2006–2011)
 Matthew Lloyd (expert commentator & The Fifth Quarter) (2009–2011)
 Stephen Silvagni (expert commentator) (2002–2006)
 Mark Howard (boundary rider) (2007–2011)
 Andrew Maher (The Fifth Quarter, Before the Game and boundary rider VIC matches) (2002–2011)
 Kelli Underwood (commentator and boundary rider) (2009–2011)
 Christi Malthouse (boundary rider) (2002–2008)
 Gerard Whateley (boundary rider and commentator) (2002–2003) 
 Peter Daicos (expert commentator) (2002–2003)
 Neil Cordy (boundary rider NSW matches) (2002–2011)
 Tim Gossage (boundary rider WA matches) (2002–2011)
 Bill McDonald (boundary rider QLD matches) (2002–2011)
 Corey Wingard (boundary rider SA matches) (2006–2011)

1988 State Games
 Phil Marker (host and commentator) (1988)
 Ian Day (commentator) (1988)
 Graham Campbell (commentator) (1988)

Aussie Bowl
 Stephen Quartermain (host) (1987–1988)
 Bruce McAvaney (commentator) (1987–1988)
 Eddie McGuire (commentator) (1987–1988)

Victorian Football Association

 Rex Hunt
 Bruce McAvaney
 Eddie McGuire
 Fred Cook
 Ted Henry
 Craig Kelly
 Ken Bennett
 Rob Astbury
 Clem Dimsey
 Ray Shaw
 Rob Astbury

The Game Plan
 Anthony Hudson (Host, 2011)
 Mark Howard (Host, 2012)
 Wayne Carey (Panelist, 2012)
 Scott Cummings (Panelist, 2011–2012)
 Matthew Lloyd (Panelist, 2011–2012)

Before the Game
 Andy Maher (Host, 2005–2013)
 Anthony Hudson (Host, 2003–2004)
 Peter Helliar (Panelist, 2003–2006)
 Damian Callinan (Panelist, 2003)
 Sam Lane (Panelist, 2003–2012)
 Dave Hughes (Panelist, 2003–2013)
 Anthony Lehmann (2004–2013)
 Mick Molloy (2007–2013)
 Ryan Fitzgerald (2010–2013)
 Neroli Meadows (2013)

Olympic and Commonwealth Games

Glasgow 2014 CWG
From Glasgow studio

 Mel McLaughlin (late evening host)
 Matthew White (early morning host)
 Ian Thorpe (late evening co-host)
 Steve Hooker (early morning co-host)
 Leisel Jones (early morning co-host)
 Mark Howard (triathlon commentator/overnight host (when swimming finished)/hockey finals host on 10 Bold/poolside interviews/reporter)
 Tim Gossage (reporter)
 Roz Kelly (reporter)
From Melbourne (commentators lounge)
 Greg Rust (early evening host on 10 Bold)
 Gordon Bray (opening/closing ceremonies, hockey & rugby 7s commentator)
 Nicole Livingstone (swimming commentator)
 Liz Ellis (netball commentator)
 Emma Snowsill
 Rob de Castella
 Dave Culbert
 Melinda Gainsford-Taylor
 Scott McGrory
 Brad McEwan
 Sharelle McMahon
 Matt Burke
 Peter Donegan
 Ian Cohen

Sochi 2014 Winter Olympics

 Stephen Quartermain (Host)
 Steven Bradbury (Host)
 Mel McLaughlin (Host)
 Greg Rust (Host)
 Brad McEwan (Host)
 Nicole Livingstone (Host)
 Alisa Camplin
 Steven Lee
 Dave Culbert
 Rob Waters
 Nuala Hafner
 Mark Howard (Reporter)
 Max Futcher (Reporter)
 Matt Doran (Reporter)
 HG Nelson (Russian Revolution host)
 Roy Slaven (Russian Revolution host)

Delhi 2010 CWG
Various Ten programs including Toasted TV, Totally Wild, Puzzle Play, Huey's Kitchen, Neighbours, The 7PM Project, and Sports Tonight goes on hiatus during Ten's broadcast of the Commonwealth Games.

 Brad McEwan (Good Morning Delhi co-host)
 Kathryn Robinson (Good Morning Delhi co-host)
 Stephen Quartermain (afternoon host)
 Bill Woods (evening host)
 Corey Wingard (late nights host)
 Tim Lane (Athletics commentators)
 Dave Culbert (Athletics commentator)
 Rob de Castella (Athletics)
 Melinda Gainsford-Taylor (Athletics)
 Anthony Hudson (Swimming/Diving commentator)
 Nicole Livingstone (Swimming commentator)
 Dean Pullar (Diving commentator)
 Phil Liggett (Cycling commentator)
 Michael Turtur (Cycling)
 Dan Ryan (Gymnastics commentator)
 Stephanie Moorhouse (Gymnastics)
 Liz Ellis (Netball commentator)
 Luke Darcy (Netball commentator)
 Rob Waters (Hockey commentator)
 Brent Livermore (Hockey Commentator)
 Michael Christian (Weightlifting Commentator)
 Damian Brown (Weightlifting)
 Mark Howard (poolside interviews/reporter)
 Andy Maher (athletics reporter)
 Max Futcher (Reporter)
 Sandra Sully (Sports updates)
 Helen Kapalos (Sports updates)

Victoria 1994 CWG

 Tim Webster (host)
 Matt White (host)
 Anne Fulwood (host)
 Bill Woods (host)
 Norman May (Swimming/Ceremonies)
 Stephen Quartermain (Swimming)
 Rob Woodhouse (Swimming)
 Sandra Sully (Swimming)
 Gordon Bray (Athletics)
 Peter Donegan (Athletics)
 Gary Honey (Athletics)
 Rick Timperi (Boxing)
 Don Wagstaff (Badminton)
 Robert Kabbas (Weightlifting)
 Phil Liggett (Cycling)
 Tony Charlton (Gymnastics)
 Rob de Castella (Marathon)
 Tim Bailey (Reporter)

Seoul 1988 Olympics

 Mike Gibson (host)
 Bruce McAvaney (host/Athletics commentator)
 Tim Webster (host)
 Graeme Hughes (host)
 Raelene Boyle
 Mark Tonelli
 Stephen Quartermain
 Ron Clarke

Motorsport

Supercars Championship
Final

 Matthew White (commentator 2002–2003, host, 2015–2020)
 Rick Kelly (analysis, 2015–2020)
 Mark Howard (pit reporter, 2015–2018)
 Grant Denyer (reporter, 2015–2020)
 Kate Peck (reporter, 2015–2020)

Formula 1

 Tara Rushton (Australian Grand Prix Host, 2022–present)
 Mark Webber (Australian Grand Prix expert analysis, 2014-2019, 2022–)
 James Allen (Australian Grand Prix Ground correspondent)

MotoGP

 Daryl Beattie (expert analysis, 2003–)
 Tara Rushton (host, 2022–present)
 Scott Mackinnon (2022–present)
 Sam Charlwood (motorsport expert, 2022–present)

RPM
 Matthew White (host, 2015-2020)
 Alan Jones (F1, 2015-2020)
 Daryl Beattie (MotoGP, 2015-2020)

Past

 Matthew White (host and Australian Grand Prix Main commentator, 2015-2019)
 Mel McLaughlin (Australian GP host, 2014–2016)
 Alan Jones (F1, 2003–2020)
 Adam Gilchrist (Australian Grand Prix host, 2016–2018)
 Rick Kelly (expert analysis, 2015–2020)
 Kate Peck (reporter, 2015–2020)
 Bill Woods (RPM/Supercars/F1/MotoGP host/commentator, 1997–2006)
 Mark Howard (MotoGP Host/Australian Grand Prix Pit Reporter, 2009-2018)
 Barry Sheene (RPM/MotoGP commentator, 1997–2002)
 Neil Crompton (RPM/F1/Supercars/commentator, 1997–2006)
 Leigh Diffey (Supercars host/commentator, 1997–1999, 2001, 2005–2006)
 Craig Baird (RPM/F1/MotoGP expert analysis, 2010–2012)
 Cameron McConville (RPM/F1 expert analysis, 2007–2009)
 Mark Larkham (expert analysis, 2015–2017)

Rugby Union

Final

 Gordon Bray (commentator, 2013–2020)
 Matt Burke (host/commentator, 2013–2020)
 Nathan Sharpe (sideline commentator, 2015–2020)
 Greg Rust (NZ sideline commentator, 2020)
 Morgan Turinui (AUS sideline commentator, 2020)

Former
 Stirling Mortlock (sideline commentator, 2013–2014)
 Stephen Moore (expert analysis, 2014)
 Matthew White (host, 2014–2019)

Rugby World Cup
 Gordon Bray (commentator, 2019)
 Matt Burke (commentator, 2019)
 Bill Woods (Host, 2007)
 Ben Darwin (Analysis, 2007)
 Ben Tune (Analysis, 2007)

Cricket

Big Bash League

 Mark Howard (host/commentator, 2013–2018)
 Adam Gilchrist (host/commentator, 2013–2018)
 Andrew Maher (commentator, 2013–2018)
 Ricky Ponting (commentator, 2013–2018)
 Damien Fleming (commentator, 2013–2018)
 Mark Waugh (commentator, 2013–2018)
 Tim Gossage (boundary) commentator, Perth games, 2013–2018)
 Mel Jones (commentator/boundary commentator, 2015–2018)
 Lisa Sthalekar (boundary) commentator, 2015–2018)
 Kevin Pietersen (guest commentator, 2014–2018)
 Darren Lehmann (guest commentator, 2016–2018)
 Andrew Symonds (guest commentator, 2016–2018)
 Brendon McCullum (guest commentator, 2016–2018)
 Michael Vaughan (guest commentator, 2017–2018)
 Graeme Swann (guest commentator, 2017–2018)
 Viv Richards (guest commentator, 2013–2015)
 Mel McLaughlin (host, 2013–2016)
 Andrew Flintoff (commentator, 2014–2016)

Women's Big Bash League

 Andrew Maher (host/commentator, 2015–2018)
 Adam Gilchrist (host/commentator, 2016–2018)
 Mel Jones (commentator, 2015–2018)
 Lisa Sthalekar (commentator, 2015–2018)
 Belinda Clark (guest commentator, 2015–2018)
 Mel McLaughlin (host, 2015–2016)

XXXX Gold Beach Cricket
 Andrew Maher (host/commentator)
 Tim Bailey (commentator)
 Colin Miller (commentator)
 Graham Gooch (commentator)

Swimming

 Nicole Livingstone (commentator, 2009–2015)
 Mark Howard (poolside interviews, 2009–2014)
 Tim Gossage (poolside interviews, 2015)
 Mel McLaughlin (host, 2014–2015)
 Anthony Hudson (host/commentator, 2009–2011)
 Stephen Quartermain (host/commentator, 2012)
 Leisel Jones (co-host, 2014)

Netball – ANZ Premiership and Diamonds Matches

 Kelli Underwood (Caller)
 Luke Darcy (Caller)
 Catherine Cox (Expert)
 Bianca Chatfield (Expert)
 Liz Ellis (Expert)
 Sharelle McMahon (Expert)
 Dan Ryan (Courtside)

Rugby League

Winfield Cup

 Rex Mossop (Host)
 Ray Warren (Chief Commentator)
 Peter Sterling (Commentator)
 Graeme Hughes (Commentator)
 Wayne Pearce (Commentator)

Tooheys Challenge Cup

The Game Plan (NRL)
 Steve Roach (Panelist, 2011–2013)
 Joel Caine (Panelist, 2011–2013)

Logo history

See also
ABC Sport
Seven Sport
Nine's Wide World of Sports
SBS Sport
Fox Sports (Australia)
Sports broadcasting contracts in Australia

References

External links

 
1965 establishments in Australia
Sports divisions of TV channels